Marshal Vasilevsky was a  of the Russian Navy.

Development and design 

Project 1155 dates to the 1970s when it was concluded that it was too costly to build large-displacement, multi-role combatants. The concept of a specialized surface ship was developed by Soviet designers.

They are 156m in length, 17.3m in beam and 6.5m in draught.

Construction and career 
Marshal Vasilevsky was laid down on 22 April 1979, and launched on 29 December 1981 by Severnaya Verf in Saint Petersburg. She was commissioned on 8 December 1983. On December 12, 1983, the naval ensign was raised for the first time. January 18, 1984 she was included in the KSF.

In 1986, she conducted combat patroling in the Mediterranean Sea.

In the 1990s she was a member of the 10th Brigade of Large Anti-Submarine Ships of the Second Division of Anti-Submarine Ships of the Kola Flotilla of various forces of the Northern Fleet. Her military unit number was 31247.

From 1996 to 1998 she was based at berth 20 in Severomorsk and survived decommissioning of several other Udaloy class ships. At the end of 1997 the reduced crew of the Udaloy was transferred to the Marshal Vasilevsky. On account of nonfunctioning engines she was moored at the berth with a full ammunition load while in the city of Severomorsk.

The last time she went to sea was in April 1997. During this final sortie the ship's hydroacoustics recorded contact with a foreign submarine lasting 10 minutes. By order of the commander of the Kola flotilla, the ship's hydroacoustics team, which recorded the contact, received a bonus short-term vacation.

In 2004 the mountings of the AK-100 guns were dismantled and removed from the ship. They were installed on the Vice-Admiral Kulakov during her repair.

On December 11, 2006 (according to other sources, February 10, 2007), the naval flag was solemnly lowered on the ship and the crew was disbanded.

Gallery

References 

1981 ships
Ships built at Severnaya Verf
Cold War destroyers of the Soviet Union
Udaloy-class destroyers